Workhuman is a multinational company co-headquartered in Framingham, Massachusetts and Dublin, providing cloud-based (software as a service), human capital management (HCM) software solutions.  Its social recognition solutions are designed for employees to recognize and reward each other.

History and company information 

Workhuman (formerly Globoforce) was co-founded in 1999 by Eric Mosley and Eddie Reynolds in Dublin, Ireland. The company is backed by Atlas Venture and Balderton Capital.  In 2005, the company re-located part of its operations to the United States. 

Globoforce has been given numerous honors as a top place to work by The Boston Globe, Fortune Magazine, and Ireland's Great Place to Work Institute.

Some of Workhuman's customers include Symantec, Dell Technologies, Intuit, JetBlue, Cisco, and InterContinental Hotels Group. In February 2019, the company changed its name from Globoforce to Workhuman.

References 

Organizations established in 1999
Companies based in Dublin (city)
Software companies of Ireland
1999 establishments in Ireland